is a Japanese model and reality television star. She has also appeared in film and music videos.

Works

Television 
 Terrace House: Boys × Girls Next Door (2012–2014)
 Hibana: Spark (2016) 
 Terrace House: Opening New Doors (2017–18)

Films 
 Terrace House: Closing Door (2015)

Books 
 島袋聖南スタイルブック『I am SEINA』 (宝島社 2015, ISBN 9784800236807)

References

External links 
 
 Official blog (島袋聖南オフィシャルブログ)

Japanese television personalities
Japanese female models
Japanese actresses
1987 births
Living people
Ryukyuan people